Tell Billa (also Tell Billah and Baasheikhah) is an archaeological site near Bashiqa in Nineveh Province (Iraq) 20 kilometers northeast of Mosul. Beginning in Middle Assyrian times the ancient city, not far from Assur, was named Shibaniba. Its earlier name is not known. In 2022 it was proposed that Tell Billa was the site of the Ur III period Hurrian city Šimānum (known as Asimānum during the Akkadian Empire).

History of archaeological research
After some minor soundings done by Austen Henry Layard around 1850, Tell Billa was excavated between 1930 and 1934 by a team from the University of Pennsylvania and the American Schools of Oriental Research. The excavation was led by Ephraim Avigdor Speiser with Charles Bache. The work was complicated by the fact that the mound was divided up among 18 owners including
a Jacobite church.

Tell Billa and its environment

Occupation history
There is some evidence of occupation as far back as the Uruk period, including some Hurrian presence in the middle second millennium. An Uruk period cylinder seal was found at the site, a presentation scene of Istar. A few preliterate clay tokens were also found. The Hurrian artifacts were identified in the excavators' Stratum 3. The comparison with the similar artefacts from Nuzi led Speiser to conclude that the Hurrians settled at Billa before they moved on to Nuzi. 

The majority of excavated material, however, is from the Middle Assyrian and Neo-Assyrian times, including glyptic and epigraphic material. Ninety One Middle Assyrian tablets (ca. 1400-1000 BC) are attested from Tell Billa/Shibaniba. Several Middle Assyrian faience items were also found at Tell Billa. The name Shibaniba relates to this period of its history.

Some ceramic remains of the Parthian period were found at the site.

See also

Cities of the ancient Near East

References

Further reading
Charles  Bache, "From Mr. Bache’s Reports on the Joint Excavation at Tell Billah." Bulletin of the American Schools of Oriental Research, no. 50, 1933
Goodman, Reed Charles. "Tell Billa's Bull Pendant: A Connection to Middle Assyrian Assur" Assyromania and More. In Memory of Samuel M. Paley, hrsg. v. Friedhelm Pedde, Nathanael Shelley (marru 4)., pp. 187-196, 2018
Creamer, Petra M. "Domestic Architecture and Household Structure at Late Bronze Age Tell Billa." Ancient Near Eastern Studies 58, pp. 147-172, 2021
Speiser, Dr. "The Excavation of Tell Billah: Letter from Dr. Speiser to the Directors of the American School of Oriental Research in Baghdad and of the University Museum,(October 30, 1931)." Bulletin of the American Schools of Oriental Research 44.1, pp. 2-5, 1931
Speiser, Dr. "Tell Billah: Letter from Dr. Speiser to the Directors of the American School in Baghdad and the University Museum." Bulletin of the American Schools of Oriental Research 45.1, pp. 32-34, 1932
Speiser, E. A. "An inscribed lance-butt from Tell Billah V." Bulletin of the American Schools of Oriental Research 50.1, pp. 11-13, 1933
Speiser, E. A. "An Assyrian Document of the Ninth Century BC from Tell Billah." Bulletin of the American Schools of Oriental Research 54.1, pp. 20-21, 1934
C. L. Wooley and E.A. Speiser, Excavations at Ur;the Pottery of Tell Billa, The Museum Journal, vol. 23, no. 3, pp. 249–308, 1933
Claudio Saporetti, Middle Assyrian Texts of Tell Billa (Graphemic Categorization, No 3), Undena Publications, 1990, 
Speiser, E. A., Gleanings from the Tell Billa texts, Symbolae ad iura orientis antiqui pertinentes Paolo Koschaker dedicatae, Leiden, Brill, pp. 141–50, 1939
Donald Matthews, Middle Assyrian Glyptic from Tell Billa, IRAQ, vol. 53, pp. 17-42, 1991
Speiser, E. A. “The Cuneiform Tablets from Tell Billa.” Bulletin of the American Schools of Oriental Research, no. 71, pp. 23–24, 1938

External links
Digitizing Tell Billa - work on publishing 1930s digs
Expedition video from the University of Pennsylvania Museum 4
Expedition video from the University of Pennsylvania Museum 3
Expedition video from the University of Pennsylvania Museum 2
3rd Millennium BC cylinder seal from Tell Billa - possibly lost
Archaeological site photographs from the Oriental Institute
Digital Tell Billa tablets at CDLI

Tells (archaeology)
Archaeological sites in Iraq
Former populated places in Iraq
Nineveh Governorate